The NBR J Class (LNER Classes D29 & D30), commonly known as the Scott class, were a class of 4-4-0 steam tender locomotives designed by William P. Reid for the North British Railway.  They passed to the London and North Eastern Railway at the grouping in 1923. Forty-three were built, of which thirty-five (ten D29s and twenty-five D30s) survived into British Railways ownership in 1948.

Overview
The Original J Class locomotives were based on the NBR K Class mixed traffic 4-4-0s.  The J Class had 6' 6" driving wheels for express passenger work and a large tender which carried sufficient water to allow passenger trains to run non-stop between Edinburgh and Carlisle. These locomotives were named after characters in the novels of Sir Walter Scott and naturally became known as "Scotts".  Some of the names were later re-used on LNER Peppercorn Class A1 locomotives.

Builders
Six locomotives were built in 1909 by the North British Locomotive Company and a further ten were built in 1911 by the North British Railway at its Cowlairs railway works, followed by two further identical locomotives with superheaters. The NBR always referred to these locomotives as J Class, but the LNER classified the initial 16 locomotives D29, and the two superheated locomotives as D30. A further 25 superheated locomotives were built between 1914 and 1920 and the LNER classified these as D30/2.

Accidents and incidents

On 3 January 1917, locomotive No. 421 Jingling Geordie overran signals and was in a head-on collision with an express passenger train at Ratho, Lothian. Twelve people were killed and 44 were seriously injured. Irregular operating procedures were a major contributory factor in the accident. These were subsequently stopped.

Numbers and names
British Railways numbers were:
 D29, 62401-62413 (with gaps)
 D30, 62417-62442 (62433 missing)

NBR no. 898 was named after Sir Walter Scott the author of the Waverley Novels, and the others were given the names either of those novels, or of characters and places in them. The LNER increased the NBR numbers by 9000, and these were applied between 1924 and 1926. New LNER numbers were allotted in 1943 in the order of construction, but the locos were not renumbered until 1946, by which time two had been withdrawn. British Railways increased the LNER 1946 numbers by 60000 between 1948 and 1950, but some were withdrawn before this could be carried out. Numbers in parentheses were allocated but not carried.

References

J
4-4-0 locomotives
Railway locomotives introduced in 1909
Standard gauge steam locomotives of Great Britain
Passenger locomotives